Robert Albert DeFruiter (June 3, 1918 – January 12, 2000) was an American football halfback in the National Football League for the Washington Redskins, the Detroit Lions, and the Los Angeles Rams.  He played college football at the University of Nebraska.

1918 births
2000 deaths
American football running backs
Nebraska Cornhuskers football players
Washington Redskins players
Detroit Lions players
Los Angeles Rams players
Sportspeople from Nebraska
People from Gosper County, Nebraska